Idris Ilunga Mbombo (born 1 June 1996 in Lubumbashi, DR Congo) is a Congolese professional footballer who currently plays for wadi Degla in Egyptian Premier league.

Zambia

Netting over 22 goals to aid Kabwe Warriors in their quest for promotion in 2015, Mbombo gained cult hero status at the club despite staying for only one season.

Earning a reported salary of 17000 Zambian kwacha a month with ZESCO United, the Congolese forward once gave an impertinent gesture to ZESCO fans after scoring for them, later apologizing for his conduct.

Was recalled to Kabwe warriors from ZESCO United in winter 2016.

He was set to join Tanzanian Club Yanga in 2020 but the deal fell through before he joined the Egyptian Club Degla.

References

External links 
 Mbombo entices African, European clubs 
 Idris Mbombo hands Zesco win and top spot in Group C
 at Soccerway
 at Footballdatabase.eu

Association football forwards
1996 births
KF Laçi players
Expatriate footballers in Saudi Arabia
ZESCO United F.C. players
Democratic Republic of the Congo footballers
People from Lubumbashi
Nkana F.C. players
Living people
Expatriate footballers in Zambia
Expatriate footballers in Albania
Al-Shabab FC (Riyadh) players
Democratic Republic of the Congo expatriate footballers
Kabwe Warriors F.C. players
21st-century Democratic Republic of the Congo people